Jan Baránek (born 1 July 1970) is a Czech former football player. He made more than 300 appearances in the top flight of Czechoslovak and later Czech football. He was captain at Opava.

In 2007, he was manager of Jakubčovice Fotbal. His brother Vít Baránek and son Jan Baránek, Jr. are also professional football players.

Honours

Managerial
 SFC Opava
Moravian-Silesian Football League: 2013–14

References

External links
 

1970 births
Living people
People from Uherské Hradiště
Czech footballers
Czechoslovak footballers
Czech First League players
MFK Vítkovice players
FK Drnovice players
SFC Opava players
FC Baník Ostrava players
SFC Opava managers
Association football midfielders
Czech football managers
Sportspeople from the Zlín Region